Albadea dea is a species of moth of the family Tortricidae. It is found in Ecuador (Carchi Province and Zamora Chinchipe Province).

References

Moths described in 2002
Endemic fauna of Ecuador
Euliini
Moths of South America
Taxa named by Józef Razowski